Xenopsylla is a flea genus in the family Pulicidae.

References

External links

Siphonaptera genera
Pulicidae